Su nombre era Dolores, la Jenn que yo conocí, is a Spanish-language television series created by BTF Media. It is based on the book that executive producer Pete Salgado wrote about Jenni Rivera's life. The series is starring Luz Ramos as Jenni Rivera and Javier Díaz Dueñas as Pete Salgado. It premiered on January 15, 2017.

Cast

Main 

 Luz Ramos as Jenni Rivera
 Javier Díaz Dueñas as Pete Salgado
 Luis Felipe Tovar as Gabo
 María Rojo as Doña Rosa Saavedra
 Álex Perea as Ferny
 Marianna Burelli as Rosie Rivera
 Geraldine Galván as Chiquis Rivera
 Tomás Goros as Don Pedro
 Liliana Moyano as Julie Vázquez
 Liz Gallardo as Graciela Beltrán
 Fernando Becerril as Anthony López
 Delia Casanova as Doña Gloria Salgado
 Ricardo Leguízamo as Lupillo Rivera
 Adrián Alonso as Mikey
 Hugo Albores as Gustavo Rivera
 Arnulfo Reyes Sánchez as Pastor Pete
 Jana Raluy as Jessica Maldonado
 Andrea Ortega-Lee as Jacquie / Jacquie (17-24)
 Rubén Zamora as Juan López

Recurring 
 Hugo Catalán as Jacob Yebale
 Daniel Martínez as Esteban Loaiza
 Dagoberto Gama as Mario Macías 
 Lumi Cavazos as Gigi Jara
 Juan Manuel Bernal as Ángel del Villar
 Vanessa Bauche as Mari Urdaneta
 Claudette Maillé as Laura Lucio

Special guest stars 
 Rodrigo Massa as Taxista ojos verdes 2
 Alejandro Bracho as Padre Eric
 Enrique Arreola as Trino Marín
 Gilda Haddock as Charytín Goyco
 Alberich Bormann as Chato
 Juan Soler as Eduardo Z

Production 
The production of the series began on September 5, 2016 in Mexico and Los Angeles. Sheyla Tadeo recorded more than 20 songs for the series because Luz Ramos does not sing.

Episodes

References

External links 
 

Mexican television miniseries
2010s American television miniseries
Spanish-language television shows
Univision original programming
Jenni Rivera
2017 American television series debuts
2017 American television series endings
2017 Mexican television series debuts
2017 Mexican television series endings